Barbora Krejčíková and Rajeev Ram defeated Astra Sharma and John-Patrick Smith in the final, 7–6(7–3), 6–1 to win the mixed doubles tennis title at the 2019 Australian Open.

Gabriela Dabrowski and Mate Pavić were the defending champions, but were defeated in the quarterfinals by María José Martínez Sánchez and Neal Skupski.

Seeds

Draw

Finals

Top half

Bottom half

References

External links
 2019 Australian Open – Doubles draws and results at the International Tennis Federation
 Main Draw

Mixed Doubles
Australian Open - Mixed Doubles
Australian Open - Mixed Doubles
Australian Open (tennis) by year – Mixed doubles